Garjanai is a 1981 Indian Tamil-language film directed by C. V. Rajendran starring Rajinikanth and Madhavi . Music was scored by Ilaiyaraaja. The film was simultaneously shot in Malayalam as Garjanam and in Kannada as Garjane. All three versions of the film failed in the box office. Garjanai ran for 52 days in Chennai making it one of Rajinikanth's films which had the shortest run in theatres.

Plot 

This is about the Tamil version only.

Dr. Vijay is an honest doctor who faces off against a dangerous, diabolical gang led by Dr. Mithra and Parasuram that contaminates common food items with lethal substances and then makes profits by supplying antidotes. Geetha is Vijay's love interest, while Rekha is his sister.

Cast

Production 
All three versions were filmed simultaneously. Jayan was the original lead actor of Garjanam, the Malayalam version. While half the film was shot, he met with an accident while shooting for another film Kolilakkam and succumbed to his injuries. After that, Garjanam was completed with Rajinikanth playing the same character. Some shots of Jayan were added to the film's opening reel before the credits at screenings in Kerala. During the filming of another fight sequence, a stuntman suffered a gash after punching glass, leading to hospitalisation.

Soundtrack

Reception 
Sindhu and Jeeva, negatively reviewing the film for Kalki, called it a meow rather than the roar that the film's title translates to.

References

External links 
 

1980s Kannada-language films
1980s Malayalam-language films
1980s Tamil-language films
1981 films
1981 multilingual films
Films directed by C. V. Rajendran
Films scored by Ilaiyaraaja
Indian multilingual films